Cypress is an unincorporated community in Union Township, Vanderburgh County, in the U.S. state of Indiana.

History

An old variant name of the community was Dogtown. A post office was established under the name Cypress in 1882, and remained in operation until 1933.

Geography

References

Unincorporated communities in Vanderburgh County, Indiana
Unincorporated communities in Indiana